Mount Kamui (kamuidake) is located in the Hidaka Mountains, Hokkaidō, Japan.

References 
 Hokkaipedia
 Google Maps
 Geographical Survey Institute

Kamui